Pselaphochernes is a genus of pseudoscorpions belonging to the family Chernetidae.

The species of this genus are found in Europe and Northern America.

Species:
 Pselaphochernes anachoreta (Simon, 1878) 
 Pselaphochernes balcanicus Beier, 1932

References

Chernetidae
Pseudoscorpion genera